USS Richard E. Byrd (DDG-23), a  guided missile destroyer of the United States Navy, was named after noted polar explorer Admiral Richard E. Byrd.

The keel for Richard E. Byrd was laid on 12 April 1961 by Todd Shipbuilding Corp. Seattle, Washington. She was launched on 6 February 1962; sponsored by Mrs. Richard E. Byrd, whose daughter, Mrs. Robert G. Breyer, acted as proxy sponsor for the admiral's wife. The ship was commissioned on 7 March 1964. Decommissioned on 27 April 1990, the ship sold to Greece and used for spare parts in 1992 and sunk as a target on 19 June 2003.

Service

Following a 45-day fitting out period at Puget Sound Naval Shipyard, Bremerton, Washington, Richard E. Byrd steamed for her homeport of Norfolk, Virginia, via the Panama Canal, arriving 14 June 1964. Richard E. Byrd deployed to the Mediterranean 6 January 1965 as a unit of Destroyer Division 182.

Late January 1967 Richard E. Byrd moved south to the Jacksonville, Florida operations area, and, while serving as rescue destroyer for the aircraft carrier , she rescued Lt. (jg) John F. Dickinson, whose A4-E aircraft crashed during a landing approach. In May Richard E. Byrd was at sea as part of the screen of the carrier , which force rendezvoused with the damaged  on 9 June.

On 6 October 1969 ship and crew participated together with Senator Harry F. Byrd and Virginia Gov. Mills E. Godwin, in the dedication of Richard Evelyn Byrd Hall at the Virginia Institute of Marine Science at Gloucester Point, Virginia.

On 26 January 1975, an advance party landing party of two ship officers were mobbed by an angry demonstration of 4,000 Greeks on the island of Corfu. After being stoned, attempts were made to set their car on fire and lynch the occupants. One Greek was killed in the incident, but police and fire trucks successfully escorted the two back to their ship off shore. Over the next hours the protest demonstration regarding the Cypriot War swelled to 10,000, and Richard E. Byrd ended her port visit.

Early 1985, the start of a six-month North Atlantic cruise involved a port visit to Lisbon, Portugal. At the end of the visit on 28 January about 3 a.m. local GMT, five other NATO ships and Richard E. Byrd at Alcantara dock came under mortar fire from the terrorist group Forças Populares 25 de Abril without damage.

Decommissioning
The guided missile destroyer continued to serve until decommissioned on 27 April 1990. She was struck from the Navy list on 1 October 1992 and officially transferred to the Hellenic Navy on 26 August 1993. The hulk was towed to Salamis, Greece, on 12 October 1993 where she was used for spare parts for the other four Charles F. Adams destroyers in Greek service.

See also

References

External links

USS Richard E. Byrd (DDG-23) Google+ Page
 USS Richard E. Byrd (DDG-23) veterans website
 

Cold War destroyers of the United States
1962 ships
Charles F. Adams-class destroyers
Ships sunk as targets